Kadinjool Kalyanam is a 1991 Indian Malayalam-language family drama film directed by Rajasenan and starring Jayaram, Urvashi and Innocent. The film marks the first collaboration of Rajasenan and Jayaram. The film was dubbed in Tamil as Ennavale Adi Ennavale with actor Vikram lending his voice for Jayaram.

Plot 

Sudhakaran is a manager in an interstate bus office. He loves Ramani and they hope to marry when she finishes her studies. Sudhakaran's father, a palmist, reads Ramani's hand one day and predicts that a marriage between her and Sudhakaran will end in Sudhakaran's death. Ramani is heart broken but decides that she will not marry Sudhakaran. Sudhakaran is angry with his father for whom he has only contempt. Ramani marries another man and Sudhakaran becomes depressed.

Panicker notices his favorite employee's state of mind and promises to find him a bride worthy of his respect and love. Sudhakaran though hesitant gives into the suggestion and marries Hridayakumari.

Hridayakumari, the new bride is a simple girl with the stubbornness and willfulness of a child. Her behaviour vexes Sudhakaran and his mother. They suspect she is mentally challenged. One thing leads to another and one day, Sudhakaran's accepts the telemarketing tactics of a contract killer and pays to get Hridayakumari killed. But afterwards, Sudhakaran comes home to see that Hridayakumari has had a change of heart. He now wants to back out from this decision to kill Hridayakumari. He also learns that she is pregnant. Sudhakaran desperately tries to contact the contract killers to ask them to back out, but he couldn't contact them again. He totally panics and tries to protect Hridayakumari from unknown possibility of a murder attempt. The climax of the film reveals the characters' multi-dimensional natures.

Cast

 Jayaram as Sudhakaran
 Urvashi as Hridayakumari
 K. P. A. C. Lalitha as Chinnamalu (Sudhakaran's mother)
 Innocent as Pathira Panicker
 Jagathy Sreekumar as Sivaraman
 Suchitra Murali as  Ramani
 Oduvil Unnikrishnan as Pothuval
 Mamukkoya as Imbichi Koya
 Krishnankutty Nair as Veerabhadran (Sudhakaran's father)
 Kuthiravattam Pappu as Mathai
 Jagadish
 Rajan P. Dev
 Valsala Menon as Bhavaniyamma
 Unnimary as Kadambari (Panicker's wife)
 Sadiq as Prakashan (Mandhan Prakashan)
 T. R. Omana
 Sangeetha as Pothuval's wife
 Bobby Kottarakkara as Sankaran
 Kalabhavan Rahman as Gangadharan

Soundtrack
The film had musical score composed by Raveendran and lyrics by Bichu Thirumala, who won his second Kerala State Film Award for this movie.

 Manassil Ninnum Manassilekk - K. J. Yesudas
 Pulari Viriyum Mumbe - K. J. Yesudas

Awards
Urvashi was awarded the Kerala State Film Award for Best Actress.

Bichu Thirumala was awarded the Kerala State Film Award for Best Lyricst

References

External links
 

1991 films
1990s Malayalam-language films
Films directed by Rajasenan